Kwasi Songui is a Canadian actor. He is best known for playing the role of Jon Jon Hendricks in Blue Mountain State.

Filmography

Film

Television

Video games

References

External links
 

Year of birth missing (living people)
Living people
Canadian male film actors
Canadian male television actors
Canadian male voice actors
Black Canadian male actors
Canadian people of Zimbabwean descent
Male actors from Montreal
Concordia University alumni